The Bell Capital Cup, formerly the Bell Canada Cup is an annual ice hockey tournament staged in Ottawa, Ontario between Christmas and New Years. It is open to youth teams aged 9–13 from all over the world. The tournament attracts over 500 teams annually was named by Guinness World Records as "the world's largest hockey tournament". Proceeds from the tournament help to fund local minor hockey programs in the Ottawa area.

Format
The Bell Capital Cup offers twenty-one divisions in atom (squirt) and peewee divisions. Nineteen divisions feature boys teams in AAA, AA, A, B and House league divisions (classified as A, B and C) and two atom and peewee girls divisions (AA). The tournament provides each team with a 3-game minimum for AA, A, B and House league divisions, while teams in the AAA divisions receive a 4-game minimum. The tournament features a round-robin format, with the winner of each group advancing to the playoff round. The finals are held at Canadian Tire Centre. The games are played in 20+ venues and 35 rinks, including the Bell Sensplex, the Kanata Rec Centre, the Nepean Sportsplex, the Ray Friel Centre, the Orleans Recreation Centre, the Minto Skating Club, and the Jim Durrell Recreation Centre. Many future NHL stars have played in this tournament, as well as others who have progressed to semi-pro, NCAA, CIS, Major Junior, Junior A or Junior B career. Notable alumni include Jeffrey Skinner (Buffalo Sabres), John Tavares (Toronto Maple Leafs), Calvin De Haan (Chicago Black Hawks), Erik Gudbranson (Ottawa Senators), Artem Sergeev (KHL), as well as Alexander Ovechkin's cousin, Leonid and former NHLers Cody Ceci and Jesse Winchester.

Over the years, many top teams have travelled from all over the world to participate. These teams include: Skylands Kings (two-time champions), Los Angeles Junior Kings, Detroit Belle Tire, South Florida Golden Wolves, Moscow Dynamo, Jokerit Helsinki, German Eagles, Beijing Imperial Guard, Iqaluit Blizzards, Korea Eagles, Chunichi Jr Club (Nagoya, Japan), HC Vitkovice, Budapest Stars, Torino, Italy and Nice, France, and in 2013, the Hong Kong Ice Scrapers participated for the first time. Hundreds of the teams participating come from local associations, such as Canterbury Minor Hockey, Cumberland Minor Hockey, Gloucester Centre Minor Hockey, Kanata Minor Hockey, Metcalfe District Minor Hockey, Nepean Minor Hockey, South End Minor Hockey, and others.

2019 Tournament
The 2019 tournament had 200 teams, 5,340 players, setting a Guinness World Record. $196,000 was raised by the 2019 tournament for local minor hockey associations and charities. The Kanata Blazers were the host team.

See also
 List of festivals in Ottawa

Notes and references

External links
 

Ice hockey tournaments in Canada
Ottawa Senators